Nova Kakhovka River Port is an enterprise in the field of river transport. It is located on the Dnipro in Tavriisk (Nova Kakhovka), Kherson Oblast, Ukraine. The duration of navigation is just 270 days a year due to ice in mid-December that generally thaws by mid-March. All types of river vessels and river-sea vessels are accepted. The port provides services for the transportation of bulk mineral cargo, construction cargo, and weighing of goods. It is also possible to store cargo, taking into account the movement of the warehouse. The total area of ​​open warehouses is 61.5 thousand м².

See also
Cargo turnover of Ukrainian ports
Hydrofoil
Nova Kakhovka
Battle of Kherson
Southern Ukraine offensive
Timeline of the 2022 Russian invasion of Ukraine
2022 Russian invasion of Ukraine

References

River ports of Ukraine
Transport in Ukraine by city
Ports of Kherson Oblast
Kakhovka Raion